The 2012–13 Anaheim Ducks season was the 20th season for the National Hockey League (NHL) franchise. The season was partially cancelled due to the 2012–13 NHL lockout, which ended on January 6, 2013. The 2012–13 campaign for the Ducks commenced as a shortened, 48-game season, beginning January 19 away against the Vancouver Canucks. The shortened season featured only intra-conference games.  The Ducks compensated for a disappointing season in 2011–12 in which they struggled in the first half of the season and dug a hole that was too deep to climb out of despite a second-half resurgence. The previous season marked the second time in their last three seasons that the Ducks missed the Stanley Cup playoffs.

Despite amassing a 30–12–6 regular season record, finishing second place in the Western Conference, and winning the Pacific Division for the second time in franchise history, the Ducks disappointed in the playoffs, falling to the Detroit Red Wings 4–3. The Ducks held a 3–2 series lead in the after Game 5, but lost Game 6 in overtime to Detroit before falling apart offensively in the decisive Game 7.

Offseason

Regular season
See the game log below for detailed game-by-game regular season information.

Prior to the lockout, the original 2012–13 Anaheim Ducks regular season schedule was released in June 2012. Their home and season opener was scheduled to take place on Friday, October 12 against San Jose, and the Ducks were to have enjoyed a four-game homestand to start the season.

On Thursday, October 4, the NHL cancelled all games scheduled through Wednesday, October 24, causing the Ducks to lose their first six games of the season.  On October 19, 2012, games through November 1 were cancelled, causing the Ducks to lose three more games.  Only one week later, on October 26, all November games were cancelled, and a tentative start date of December 1 was set.  On November 23, 2012, all games through December 14 were axed, impacting six games on the Ducks' schedule.  On December 11, 2012, all games through December 30 were eliminated.  Nine days later, on December 20, 2012, further lack of negotiations during the lockout led to the cancellation of all games through January 14.

On January 6, 2013, the lockout ended after a 16-hour negotiation session in an effort to save the season.  A condensed season, of a length of 48 intra-conference games, will now be played.

Under the new, lockout-shortened 48-game schedule, the Ducks opened the season by sweeping a two-game Canadian road trip, with a decisive 7–3 victory against the Vancouver Canucks on Saturday, January 19, at 7 p.m. PST, followed by a 5–4 decision against the Calgary Flames on Monday, January 21. Their home opener will now take place at Honda Center on Friday, January 25, also against the Canucks.  The distinction of the Ducks' longest homestand will be split between two five-game stretches from March 18 – 25 and from April 3 to 10.  Anaheim's lengthiest road trip was a six-game haul from February 6 – 16.  Also, due to the shortened nature of the schedule and the objective of condensing travel, all games will be against the Ducks' own Western Conference opponents, and no games will be played against Eastern Conference teams.  This condensed schedule structure also leads to the development of anomalies absent from a normal 82-game schedule, such as playing back-to-back games against the same team in the same location.  For example, the Ducks host the Dallas Stars at Honda Center on both April 3 and 5, and later play games on two consecutive nights at the Edmonton Oilers on April 21 and 22. The Ducks will end the regular season on Saturday, April 27, at home against the Phoenix Coyotes.

Notable games

January
January 19: The Ducks open the season on the road with a 7–3 triumph over hosting Vancouver.  The Ducks break a six-season streak of losing the first game of the regular season; this is the first time they have done so since 2006–07.
January 25: The Ducks hold their home opener against Vancouver, in a rematch of the season opener six days earlier; however, in a reversal of fortunes, this time the Ducks lose by a score of 5–0.

February
February 9: Rookie goaltender Viktor Fasth improves to a perfect 5–0–0 record (making him the netminder for more than half of Anaheim's eight victories) as the Ducks defeat the faltering Blues 6–5 in a shootout thriller in St. Louis.  The Ducks rally from a 3–1 deficit at the end of the first period, scoring three goals in 1 minute, 41 seconds late in the second period.
February 12: Fasth improves to 6–0–0 and the Ducks improve to 9–2–1 and to 3–1–0 on a road swing by way of defeating the first place Chicago Blackhawks 3–2 in a shootout.  Andrew Cogliano scores a game-tying goal late in the third period to help the Ducks recover from a 2–1 deficit, and Anaheim kills off two Chicago power plays in overtime, paving the way for the eventual shootout triumph.
February 15: Anaheim defeats the Detroit Red Wings 5–2 as the Ducks grab their first regular season victory in Joe Louis Arena in five years and five days, their last regular season triumph in the Motor City being a 3–2 win on Feb 10, 2008.  Viktor Fasth remains undefeated between the pipes at a record of 7–0–0.

March
March 18: The Ducks set a franchise record with their 12th consecutive victory at home, a 5–3 triumph over San Jose.  Midway through the second period, Anaheim scores twice in 34 seconds and thrice in 2 minutes 46 seconds as Long Beach native Emerson Etem scores his first NHL goal.
March 20: In a matchup of the two top teams in the Western Conference and of two of the top teams in the NHL, the Ducks down the formidable Chicago Blackhawks 4–2 in front of the largest crowd ever for a Ducks home game at Honda Center, with a mark of 17,610.  (This breaks the old record of 17,601, also set during a Ducks–Blackhawks game, on February 26, 2012.)  The Ducks score three unanswered goals in the third period and twice in 64 seconds to roar back from a 2–1 deficit for the 4–2 win.  The triumph hands the Blackhawks only their third regulation loss of the season and follows a 3–2 overtime road win against Chicago on Feb. 12.  Anaheim also extends their home winning streak to its 13th game.
March 29: Having fallen into a four-game losing streak since the March 20 game, the Ducks face the Blackhawks again—this time in Chicago—and end their losing streak and sweep the season series with a 2–1 triumph.  Defenseman Sheldon Souray uses his trademark slapshot to score the game-winning goal with 2:08 left in the third period; the Los Angeles Times had run an article on Souray's benefits to the team that very morning.

April
April 12: While Anaheim was idle, the Ducks clinched a berth to the 2013 Stanley Cup playoffs by virtue of a Detroit loss. This is Anaheim's ninth berth to the Stanley Cup playoffs and fifth in the past seven seasons since the 2004–05 lockout.
April 21: The Ducks snapped a four-game losing streak in Edmonton at Rexall Place. This was Anaheim's tenth straight victory in Edmonton and the victory also mathematically eliminated the Oilers from playoff contention. The win also clinched home ice in the first round.
April 22:  With a 3–0 win over Edmonton at Rexall Place, the Ducks clinched their second ever Pacific Division title and the second seed in the Western Conference for the 2013 Stanley Cup playoffs. The win also extended Anaheim's winning streak in Edmonton to 11 games.

Schedule and results

Regular season
Below is the new, truncated 2012–13 schedule for the Ducks.

|- style="text-align:center; background:#bbffbb;"
| 1 || January 19 || @ Canucks || 7–3 ||  || Hiller (1–0–0) || Schneider (0–1–0) || 18,910 || 1–0–0 || Rogers Arena || W1 ||bgcolor="#bbffbb" | 2
|- style="text-align:center; background:#bbffbb;"
| 2 || January 21 || @ Flames || 5–4 ||  || Hiller (2–0–0) || Kiprusoff (0–2–0) || 19,289 || 2–0–0 || Scotiabank Saddledome || W2 ||bgcolor="#bbffbb" | 4
|- style="text-align:center; background:#ffbbbb"
| 3 || January 25 || Canucks || 5–0 ||  || Schneider (2–1–0) || Hiller (2–1–0) || 17,529 || 2–1–0 || Honda Center || L1 ||bgcolor="#bbcaff" | 4
|- style="text-align:center; background:#bbffbb"
| 4 || January 26 || Predators || 3–2 || SO || Fasth (1–0–0) || Rinne (0–1–3) || 17,174 || 3–1–0 || Honda Center || W1 ||bgcolor="#bbcaff" |6
|- style="text-align:center; background:#ffdddd"
| 5 || January 29 || @ Sharks || 3–2 || SO || Niemi (5–0–0) || Hiller (2–1–1) || 17,562 || 3–1–1 || HP Pavilion || O1 ||bgcolor="#bbcaff" | 7  
|-

|- style="text-align:center; background:#bbffbb;"
| 6 || February 1 || Wild || 3–1 ||  || Fasth (2–0–0) || Backstrom (3–2–1) || 13,007 || 4–1–1 || Honda Center || W1 ||bgcolor="#bbcaff" | 9
|- style="text-align:center; background:#bbffbb;"
| 7 || February 2 || Kings || 7–4 ||  || Hiller (3–1–1) || Bernier (0–1–0) || 17,436 || 5–1–1 || Honda Center ||  W2 ||bgcolor="#bbcaff" | 11
|- style="text-align:center; background:#bbffbb;"
| 8 || February 4 || Sharks || 2–1 ||  || Fasth (3–0–0) || Greiss (1–1–0) || 14,324 || 6–1–1  || Honda Center || W3 ||bgcolor="#bbcaff" | 13
|- style="text-align:center; background:#bbffbb;"
| 9 || February 6 || @ Avalanche || 3–0 ||  || Fasth (4–0–0) || Varlamov (3–6–0) || 13,776 || 7–1–1 || Pepsi Center || W4 ||bgcolor="#bbffbb" | 15
|- style="text-align:center; background:#ffbbbb;"
| 10 || February 8 || @ Stars || 3–1 ||  || Lehtonen (6–2–1) || Hiller (3–2–1) || 18,112 || 7–2–1 || American Airlines Center || L1 ||bgcolor="#bbffbb" | 15
|- style="text-align:center; background:#bbffbb;"
| 11 || February 9 || @ Blues || 6–5 || SO || Fasth (5–0–0) || Elliott (3–4–1) || 18,835 || 8–2–1 || Scottrade Center || W1 ||bgcolor="#bbffbb" | 17
|-  style="text-align:center; background:#bbffbb;"
| 12 || February 12 || @ Blackhawks || 3–2 || SO || Fasth (6–0–0) || Crawford (7–0–3) || 21,188 || 9–2–1 || United Center || W2 ||bgcolor="#bbffbb" | 19
|- style="text-align:center; background:#bbffbb;"
| 13 || February 15 || @ Red Wings || 5–2 ||  || Fasth (7–0–0) || Howard (6–5–2) || 20,066 || 10–2–1 || Joe Louis Arena || W3 ||bgcolor="#bbffbb" | 21
|- style="text-align:center; background:#bbffbb;"
| 14 || February 16 || @ Predators || 3–2 || SO || Fasth (8–0–0) || Rinne (6–3–4) || 17,322 || 11–2–1 || Bridgestone Arena || W4 ||bgcolor="#bbffbb" | 23
|- style="text-align:cnter; background:#bbffbb;"
| 15 || February 18 || Blue Jackets || 3–2 ||  || Hiller (4–2–1) || Bobrovsky (2–5–2) || 14,713 || 12–2–1 || Honda Center || W5 ||bgcolor="#bbffbb" | 25
|- style="text-align:center; background:#bbffbb;"
| 16 || February 24 || Avalanche || 4–3 || OT || Hiller (5–2–1) || Giguere (2–0–1) || 17,174 || 13–2–1 || Honda Center || W6 ||bgcolor="#bbffbb" | 27
|- style="text-align:center; background:#ffbbbb;"
| 17 || February 25 || @ Kings || 5–2 ||  || Quick (6–5–2) || Fasth (8–1–0) || 18,118 || 13–3–1 || Staples Center || L1 ||bgcolor="#bbffbb" | 27
|- style="text-align:center; background:#bbffbb;"
| 18 || February 27 || Predators || 5–1 ||  || Fasth (9–1–0) || Rinne (8–6–4) || 13,630 || 14–3–1 || Honda Center || W1 ||bgcolor="#bbffbb" | 29
|-

|- style="text-align:center; background:#bbffbb;"
| 19 || March 1 || Wild || 3–2 ||  || Hiller (6–2–1) || Kuemper (1–2–0) || 15,264 || 15–3–1 || Honda Center || W2 ||bgcolor="#bbffbb" | 31
|- style="text-align:center; background:#ffdddd;"
| 20 || March 2 || @ Coyotes || 5–4 || SO || Smith (8–6–2) || Fasth (9–1–1) || 15,227 || 15–3–2 || Jobing.com Arena || O1 ||bgcolor="#bbffbb" | 32
|- style="text-align:center; background:#ffdddd;"
| 21 || March 4 || @ Coyotes || 5–4 || SO || Smith (9–6–2) || Hiller (6–2–2) || 11,024 || 15–3–3 || Jobing.com Arena || O2 ||bgcolor="#bbffbb" | 33
|- style="text-align:center; background:#bbffbb;"
| 22 || March 6 || Coyotes || 2–0 ||  || Hiller (7–2–2) || LaBarbera (1–3–0) || 13,456 || 16–3–3 || Honda Center || W1 ||bgcolor="#bbffbb" | 35
|- style="text-align:center; background:#bbffbb;"
| 23 || March 8 || Flames || 4–0 ||  || Fasth (10–1–1) || Kiprusoff (3–4–2) || 15,839 || 17–3–3 || Honda Center || W2 ||bgcolor="#bbffbb" | 37
|- style="text-align:center; background:#bbffbb;"
| 24 || March 10 || Blues || 4–2 ||  || Hiller (8–2–2) || Halák (5–3–1) || 17,174 || 18–3–3 || Honda Center || W3 ||bgcolor="#bbffbb" | 39
|- style="text-align:center; background:#bbffbb;"
| 25 || March 12 || @ Wild || 2–1 ||  || Hiller (9–2–2) || Backstrom (11–7–2) || 18,808 || 19–3–3 || Xcel Energy Center || W4 ||bgcolor="#bbffbb" | 41
|- style="text-align:center; background:#bbffbb;"
| 26 || March 14 || @ Stars || 2–1 || SO || Hiller (10–2–2) || Lehtonen (9–5–2) || 15,775 || 20–3–3 || American Airlines Center || W5 ||bgcolor="#bbffbb" | 43
|- style="text-align:center; background:#ffdddd;"
| 27 || March 16 || @ Blues || 2–1 || OT || Allen (8–1–0) || Hiller (10–2–3) || 19,593 || 20–3–4 || Scottrade Center || O1 ||bgcolor="#bbffbb" | 44
|- style="text-align:center; background:#bbffbb;"
| 28 || March 18 || Sharks || 5–3 ||  || Fasth (11–1–1) || Niemi (11–7–5) || 14,441 || 21–3–4 || Honda Center || W1 ||bgcolor="#bbffbb" | 46
|- style="text-align:center; background:#bbffbb;"
| 29 || March 20 || Blackhawks || 4–2 ||  || Hiller (11–2–3) || Crawford (13–3–3) || 17,610 || 22–3–4 || Honda Center || W2 ||bgcolor="#bbffbb" | 48
|- style="text-align:center; background:#ffbbbb;"
| 30 || March 22 || Red Wings || 5–1 ||  || Howard (13–8–4) || Fasth (11–2–1) || 17,174 || 22–4–4 || Honda Center || L1 ||bgcolor="#bbffbb" | 48
|- style="text-align:center; background:#ffbbbb;"
| 31 || March 24 || Red Wings || 2–1 ||  || Howard (14–8–4) || Hiller (11–3–3) || 17,427 || 22–5–4 || Honda Center || L2 ||bgcolor="#bbffbb" | 48
|- style="text-align:center; background:#ffbbbb;"
| 32 || March 25 || Sharks || 5–3 ||  || Niemi (13–8–5) || Fasth (11–3–1) || 16,083 || 22–6–4 || Honda Center || L3 ||bgcolor="#bbffbb" | 48
|- style="text-align:center; background:#ffbbbb;"
| 33 || March 27 || @ Sharks || 4–0 ||  || Niemi (14–8–5) || Hiller (11–4–3) || 17,562 || 22–7–4 || HP Pavilion ||L4 ||bgcolor="#bbffbb" | 48
|- style="text-align:center; background:#bbffbb;"
| 34 || March 29 || @ Blackhawks || 2–1 ||  || Hiller (12–4–3) || Emery (16–12–1) || 22,105 || 23–7–4 || United Center ||W1 ||bgcolor="#bbffbb" | 50
|- style="text-align:center; background:#ffdddd;"
| 35 || March 31 || @ Blue Jackets || 2–1 || OT || Bobrovsky (12–8–6) || Hiller (12–4–4) || 13,185 || 23–7–5 || Nationwide Arena ||O1 ||bgcolor="#bbffbb" | 51
|-

|- style="text-align:center; background:#bbffbb;"
| 36 || April 1 || @ Stars || 4–0 ||  || Fasth (12–3–1) || Lehtonen (12–10–2) || 13,748 || 24–7–5 ||American Airlines Center || W2 ||bgcolor="#bbffbb" | 53
|- style="text-align:center; background:#bbffbb;"
| 37 || April 3 || Stars || 5–2 ||  || Fasth (13–3–1) || Lehtonen (12–11–2) || 15,165 || 25–7–5 || Honda Center || W3 ||bgcolor="#bbffbb" | 55
|- style="text-align:center; background:#ffbbbb;"
| 38 || April 5 || Stars || 3–1 ||   || Lehtonen (13–11–2) || Fasth (13–4–1) || 16,884 || 25–8–5 || Honda Center || L1 ||bgcolor="#bbffbb" | 55
|- style="text-align:center; background:#bbffbb;"
| 39 || April 7 || Kings || 4–3 || SO || Fasth (14–4–1) || Bernier (9–2–1) || 17,494 || 26–8–5 || Honda Center || W1 ||bgcolor="#bbffbb" | 57
|-  style="text-align:center; background:#bbffbb;"
| 40 || April 8 || Oilers || 2–1 ||  || Hiller (13–4–4) || Dubnyk (12–12–6) || 15,148 || 27–8–5 || Honda Center || W2 ||bgcolor="#bbffbb" | 59
|-  
|- style="text-align:center; background:#ffbbbb;"
| 41 || April 10 || Avalanche || 4–1 ||  || Giguere (3–4–2) || Hiller (13–5–4) || 14,646 || 27–9–5 || Honda Center || L1 ||bgcolor="#bbffbb" | 59
|- style="text-align:center; background:#ffbbbb;"
| bgcolor="#000078" |  42 || bgcolor="#000078" |  April 13* || @ Kings || 2–1 ||  || Quick (15–12–3) || Fasth (14–5–1) || 18,473 || 27–10–5 || Staples Center || L2 ||bgcolor="#bbffbb" | 59
|- style="text-align:center; background:#ffdddd;"
| 43 || April 17 || Blue Jackets || 3–2 || OT || Bobrovsky (17–10–6) || Fasth (14–5–2) || 15,074 || 27–10–6 || Honda Center || O1 ||bgcolor="#bbffbb" | 60
|- style="text-align:center; background:#ffbbbb;"
| 44 || April 19 || @ Flames || 3–1 ||  || Kiprusoff (8–13–2) || Hiller (13–6–4) || 19,289 || 27–11–6 || Scotiabank Saddledome || L1 ||bgcolor="#bbffbb" | 60
|- style="text-align:center; background:#bbffbb;"
| 45 || April 21 || @ Oilers || 3–1 ||  || Hiller (14–6–4) || Dubnyk (13–15–6) || 16,839 || 28–11–6 || Rexall Place || W1 ||bgcolor="#bbffbb" | 62
|-  style="text-align:center; background:#007800; color:white;"
| 46 || April 22 || @ Oilers || 3–0 ||  || Fasth (15–5–2) || Khabibulin (3–6–1) || 16,839 || 29–11–6 || Rexall Place || W2 ||bgcolor="#007800" | 64
|- style="text-align:center; background:#bbffbb;"
| 47 || April 25 || @ Canucks || 3–1 ||  || Hiller (15–6–4) || Luongo (9–5–3) || 18,910 || 30–11–6 || Rogers Arena || W3 ||bgcolor="#bbffbb" | 66
|- style="text-align:center; background:#ffbbbb;"
| 48 || April 27 || Coyotes || 5–3 ||  || LaBarbera (4–6–2) || Fasth (15–6–2) || 17,442 || 30–12–6 || Honda Center || L1 ||bgcolor="#bbffbb" | 66
|-
|colspan=12 style="text-align:left;"|* Anaheim clinched a playoff berth on April 12, 2013 by virtue of a Detroit loss. 
|-

Post-season

| 1 || April 30 || Red Wings || 3–1 ||  || Hiller (1–0) || Howard (0–1) || 17,200 || 1–0 || Honda Center || W1 
|- style="text-align:center; background:#ffbbbb;"
| 2 || May 2 || Red Wings || 5–4 || OT || Howard (1–1) || Hiller (1–1) || 17,182 || 1–1 || Honda Center || L1
|- style="text-align:center; background:#bbffbb;"
| 3 || May 4 || @ Red Wings || 4–0 ||  || Hiller (2–1) || Howard (1–2) || 20,066 || 2–1 || Joe Louis Arena || W1 
|- style="text-align:center; background:#ffbbbb;"
| 4 || May 6 || @ Red Wings || 3–2 || OT || Howard (2–2) || Hiller (2–2) || 20,066 || 2–2 || Joe Louis Arena || L1
|- style="text-align:center; background:#bbffbb;"
| 5 || May 8 || Red Wings || 3–2 || OT || Hiller (3–2) || Howard (2–3) || 17,395 || 3–2 || Honda Center || W1
|- style="text-align:center; background:#ffbbbb;"
| 6 || May 10 || @ Red Wings || 4–3 || OT || Howard (3–3) || Hiller (3–3) || 20,066 || 3–3 || Joe Louis Arena || L1
|- style="text-align:center; background:#ffbbbb;"
| 7 || May 12 || Red Wings || 3–2 ||  || Howard (4–3) || Hiller (3–4) || 17,412 || 3–4 || Honda Center || L2
|-

Standings

Player statistics

Skaters
Note: GP = Games played; G = Goals; A = Assists; Pts = Points; +/− = Plus/minus; PIM = Penalty minutes

Goaltenders
Note: GP = Games played; GS = Games Started; TOI = Time on ice (minutes); W = Wins; L = Losses; OT = Overtime losses; GA = Goals against; GAA= Goals against average; SA= Shots against; SV= Saves; Sv% = Save percentage; SO= Shutouts

†Denotes player spent time with another team before joining Ducks. Stats reflect time with Ducks only.
‡Traded mid-season. 
Bold/italics denotes franchise record

Transactions
The Ducks have been involved in the following transactions during the 2012–13 season.

Trades

|}

Free agents signed

Free agents lost

Claimed via waivers

Lost via waivers

Lost via retirement

Players signings

Draft picks
Anaheim Ducks' picks at the 2012 NHL Entry Draft, held in Pittsburgh, Pennsylvania on June 22 and 23, 2012.

Draft notes
 The Ducks' third-round pick went to the St. Louis Blues as the result of a February 28, 2011, trade that sent Brad Winchester to the Ducks in exchange for this pick.
  The Vancouver Canucks' third-round pick went to the Anaheim Ducks as a result of a February 28, 2011, trade that sent Maxim Lapierre and MacGregor Sharp to the Canucks in exchange for Joel Perrault and this pick.
  The Ducks' fifth-round pick went to the Montreal Canadiens as the result of a December 31, 2010 trade that sent Maxim Lapierre to the Ducks in exchange for Brett Festerling and this pick. The Montreal Canadiens' fifth-round pick went to the Anaheim Ducks as a result of a February 17, 2011, trade that sent Paul Mara to the Canadiens in exchange for this pick.
 The Ducks' sixth-round pick went to the Toronto Maple Leafs as the result of a June 25, 2011, trade that sent 2011 sixth-round pick to the Ducks in exchange for this pick.
  The New Jersey Devils' seventh-round pick went to the Anaheim Ducks as a result of a December 12, 2011, trade that sent Kurtis Foster and Timo Pielmeier to the Devils in exchange for Rod Pelley, Mark Fraser and this pick.

See also 
 Anaheim Ducks
 Honda Center
 2012–13 NHL season

Other Anaheim–based teams in 2012–13
Los Angeles Angels of Anaheim (Angel Stadium of Anaheim)
 2012 Los Angeles Angels of Anaheim season
 2013 Los Angeles Angels of Anaheim season

References

Anaheim Ducks seasons
Anaheim Ducks season, 2012-13
A
Anaheim Ducks
Anaheim Ducks